Grawiede is a river of Lower Saxony, Germany. It is one of the outflows of the lake Dümmer, and it flows into the Hunte near Diepholz.

See also
List of rivers of Lower Saxony

References

Rivers of Lower Saxony
Rivers of Germany